Tanyuromys aphrastus, known as the long-tailed sigmodontomys, Harris's rice water rat, or the long-tailed rice rat, is a species of rodent in the family Cricetidae. It is known from Costa Rica, Panama, and Ecuador. In 2012, it was reassigned to its current genus from Sigmodontomys.

References

Rodents of Central America
Mammals of Ecuador
aphrastus
Mammals described in 1932
Taxonomy articles created by Polbot